Betty Swords (1917–2005) was an American cartoonist whose work appeared in the Saturday Evening Post, Redbook, Good Housekeeping, Ladies Home Journal, Changing Times, and others, usually using her own gags but sometimes from other writers. She also wrote gags for Dennis the Menace and others. Her humorous writing appeared in McCall’s, Modern Maturity, The Christian Science Monitor, and others.

Swords was raised in Oakland, California, earned her Bachelor of Fine Arts at University of California, Berkeley and did graduate work the San Francisco Academy of Advertising Art.

References
"At Swords’ Point: Humor As Weapon" by R. C. Harvey, The Comics Journal, Dec. 19, 2011.

American women cartoonists
American female comics artists
American comics writers
American humorists
University of California, Berkeley alumni
Female comics writers
Artists from Oakland, California
Writers from Oakland, California
Women humorists
American cartoonists
1917 births
2005 deaths
20th-century American women
20th-century American people
21st-century American women